Pirates of the Caribbean: The Price of Freedom is a 2011 adventure novel written by Ann C. Crispin. The book details the adventures of Captain Jack Sparrow as a young man after the events of Pirates of the Caribbean: Jack Sparrow and before the events of Pirates of the Caribbean: Legends of the Brethren Court. This is the final novel written by Crispin, who died in September 2013.

Plot 
Twenty-five-year-old Jack Sparrow is a clean-cut merchant seaman pursuing a legitimate career as a first mate for the East India Trading Company. He sometimes thinks back to his boyhood pirating days, but he doesn’t miss Teague’s scrutiny or the constant threat of the noose. Besides, he doesn’t have much choice - he broke the Code when he freed a friend who had been accused of rogue piracy, and he can no longer show his face in Shipwreck Cove.

When Jack’s ship is attacked by pirates and his captain dies in the altercation, he suddenly finds himself in command. The wily sailor’s skillful negotiations with the pirate captain—who turns out to be a woman from his past—result in a favorable outcome that puts Jack in line for an official promotion.

After making port in Africa, Jack is summoned by Cutler Beckett, who makes him captain of a ship called the Wicked Wench. Beckett gives Jack an assignment. He has heard a legend about a magical island named Zerzura whose labyrinthine bowels are said to contain a glorious treasure. Beckett suspects that one of his house slaves, a girl named Ayisha, is from Zerzura. He asks Jack to take her along on his voyage and seduce her into divulging the island’s whereabouts. In payment for his services, Beckett promises Jack a share of the treasure.

But this task isn’t as easy as Jack initially believes. Before she agrees to reveal the location of her home, Ayisha insists that Jack take her to the New World to rescue her brother, who has been sold into slavery in the Bahamas. Their voyage is long and arduous, and as they weather a vicious storm and a surprise attack from an old pirate foe, Jack grows to respect and admire Ayisha’s bravery. He knows that Beckett intends to enslave her people after robbing them of their treasure, and Jack’s moral compass revolts at the idea. It might be possible to deliver Ayisha safely to Zerzura, obtain some of the treasure, and convince Beckett that he never found it... but the greedy E.I.T.C. official has eyes everywhere, and if he learns that Jack has foiled his plans, he could take away the thing that Captain Sparrow loves most: his ship—and his freedom.

Characters 
 Jack Sparrow – a former pirate working for the EITC, captain of the Wicked Wench.
 Cutler Beckett –  the EITC director for West Africa.
 Amenirdis/Ayisha – the lost princess from the island of Kerma.
 Robby Greene – a former pirate, Jack's friend and first mate of the Wicked Wench.
 Esmeralda – the Pirate Lord of the Caribbean, Jack's love interest.
 Edward Teague – Jack's father, the Pirate Lord of Madagascar and Keeper of the Pirate Code.
 Ian Mercer – Beckett's right-hand man.
 Borya Palachnik – the Pirate Lord of the Caspian Sea, leader of the rogue pirates.
 Christophe-Julien de Rapièr –  Jack's former friend, one of the rogue pirates.
 Davy Jones – Lord of the underwater realms.
 Don Rafael – Esmeralda's grandfather, the Pirate Lord of the Caribbean.
 Hector Barbossa – a pirate captain in the Caribbean.
 Pintel and Ragetti – Barbossa's crewmembers
 Eduardo Villanueva – the Pirate Lord of the Adriatic Sea.
 Mistress Ching – the Pirate Lord of the Pacific Ocean.

Ships 
 Wicked Wench, an EITC merchant ship owned by Beckett and captained by Sparrow.
 Fair Wind, an EITC merchant brig.
 Venganza, a pirate frigate captained by Don Rafael and Esmeralda.
 La Vipère, Christophe's pirate brigantine.
 Koldunya, Borya's pirate sloop.
 Troubadour, Teague's pirate ship.
 Sentinel, an EITC brig, Beckett's flagship.

Background
When an editor working for Disney was seeking an author to write a novel dealing with the backstory of Captain Jack Sparrow, a major character from the Pirates of the Caribbean franchise, they contacted Crispin's agent and contracted her to write the book after reading The Han Solo Trilogy, which focused on Han Solo's backstory. According to Crispin herself, it took her three years to write and she did a lot of research on the historical period and the nautical stuff. She was also given the script for At World's End before the film released, but my book was finished before the script for On Stranger Tides was written. The instructions for A. C. Crispin in writing Pirates of the Caribbean: The Price of Freedom were to "stick to historical fact, unless it conflicts with established Pirates of the Caribbean continuity." Crispin made a faithful effort to do this, having done plenty of research, with Under the Black Flag by David Cordingly being one of the four pirate-related books she found herself using the most consistently. When releasing the fifth excerpt of her book, Crispin spoke of how she was privileged to write the scene where Han first beheld—and fell for—the Millennium Falcon in The Han Solo Trilogy. She assured fans it was every bit as thrilling to write the scene with Jack Sparrow and the Wicked Wench. The Price of Freedom was published on May 17, 2011.

References

External links 
 Pirates of the Caribbean: The Price of Freedom at the Pirates of the Caribbean wiki

Pirates of the Caribbean
Novels about pirates
Novels based on films